Albert Clemenceau (23 February 1861 – 23 July 1955) was a French lawyer and politician. Georges Clemenceau was his brother.

Along with Fernand Labori, he was one of the defenders in the trials linked to the Dreyfus affair.

References 

19th-century French lawyers
1861 births
Politicians from Nantes
1955 deaths
Georges Clemenceau
20th-century French lawyers